Quch Qaleh-ye Olya (also Romanized as Qūch Qal‘eh-ye ‘Olyā and Qūsh Qal‘eh-ye ‘Olyā; also known as Qūch Qal‘eh-ye Bālā, Quch Qalēh-ye Bālā, Qūsh Qal‘eh, and Qūsh Qal‘eh-ye Bālā) is a village in Garmkhan Rural District, Garmkhan District, Bojnord County, North Khorasan Province, Iran. At the 2006 census, its population was 719, in 158 families.

References 

Populated places in Bojnord County